The 1975 New England Patriots season was the franchise's 6th season in the National Football League and 16th overall. The Patriots ended the season with a record of three wins and eleven losses, and finished tied for fourth in the AFC East Division. The Patriots had put up their best season in nearly a decade in 1974, finishing the year with a 7–7 record and earning their first season with at least a .500 winning percentage since 1966. However, New England continued its forgetful period of the '70s, as they finished 3–11 and missed the playoffs for the 12th straight season. New England started terribly, losing its first 4 games, each by 7 or more points. After winning 3 of their next 4 games, the Patriots would lose their final 6 games to conclude the season. Although they tied the New York Jets for last place in the AFC East, they lost the tiebreaker by virtue of New York winning both matchups during the season.

Draft

Staff

Roster

Regular season

Schedule 

Note: Intra-division opponents are in bold text.

Standings

See also 
 New England Patriots seasons

References

New England Patriots
New England Patriots seasons
New England Patriots
Sports competitions in Foxborough, Massachusetts